Microgaster is a genus of braconid wasps in the family Braconidae. There are more than 100 described species in Microgaster, found throughout most of the world.

See also
 List of Microgaster species

References

Further reading

 
 
 
 

Microgastrinae